The white-toothed rats, genus Berylmys, are a group of Old World rats from Asia.

Species
Genus Berylmys
small white-toothed rat, Berylmys berdmorei Blyth, 1851
Bower's white-toothed rat, Berylmys bowersi Anderson, 1879
Kenneth's white-toothed rat, Berylmys mackenziei Thomas, 1916
Manipur white-toothed rat, Berylmys manipulus Thomas, 1916

References